The City Bushman is a poem by iconic Australian writer and poet Henry Lawson. It was first published in The Bulletin magazine on 6 August 1892, under the title In Answer to "Banjo", and Otherwise.  It was the fourth work in the Bulletin Debate, a series of poems by both Lawson and Andrew Barton "Banjo" Paterson, and others, about the true nature of life in the Australian bush.

In The City Bushman, Lawson responds to Paterson's poem, In Defence of the Bush, quoting a number of phrases, and criticising each in turn.

See also
 1892 in poetry
 1892 in literature
 1892 in Australian literature
 Australian literature

References 

1892 poems
Poetry by Henry Lawson
Bulletin Debate
Works originally published in The Bulletin (Australian periodical)